Sherwood is a census-designated place (CDP) in Hamilton County, Ohio, United States. The population was 3,633 at the 2020 census.

Geography
Sherwood is located at  (39.088212, -84.364481).

According to the United States Census Bureau, the CDP has a total area of 1.1 square miles (2.9 km), all land.

Demographics
At the 2000 census there were 3,907 people, 1,348 households, and 1,129 families living in the CDP. The population density was 3,522.6 people per square mile (1,359.0/km). There were 1,365 housing units at an average density of 1,230.7/sq mi (474.8/km).  The racial makeup of the CDP was 96.54% White, 0.61% African American, 1.54% Asian, 0.03% Pacific Islander, 0.49% from other races, and 0.79% from two or more races. Hispanic or Latino of any race were 1.28%.

Of the 1,348 households 45.9% had children under the age of 18 living with them, 73.4% were married couples living together, 7.5% had a female householder with no husband present, and 16.2% were non-families. 14.1% of households were one person and 6.1% were one person aged 65 or older. The average household size was 2.90 and the average family size was 3.21.

The age distribution was 31.1% under the age of 18, 5.4% from 18 to 24, 27.9% from 25 to 44, 24.3% from 45 to 64, and 11.2% 65 or older. The median age was 37 years. For every 100 females, there were 94.9 males. For every 100 females age 18 and over, there were 93.4 males.

The median household income was $71,127 and the median family income  was $77,816. Males had a median income of $53,393 versus $33,194 for females. The per capita income for the CDP was $27,965. About 0.5% of families and 1.5% of the population were below the poverty line, including 1.5% of those under age 18 and 1.9% of those age 65 or over.

References

Census-designated places in Hamilton County, Ohio
Census-designated places in Ohio